is the second compilation album by Japanese band Wagakki Band. It was released on March 25, 2020 by Avex Trax in five editions: two-disc CD only, two music video editions, and two live concert editions with DVD or Blu-ray discs. In addition, a mu-mo Shop exclusive box set was released, featuring both music video and concert DVDs and Blu-ray discs, and a re-release of the band's 2013 mini-album Joshou. The album compiles the band's popular songs from all of their releases during the Avex era.

The album peaked at No. 3 on Oricon's albums chart.

Track listing
All tracks are arranged by Wagakki Band.

Personnel 
 Yuko Suzuhana – vocals
 Machiya – guitar
 Beni Ninagawa – tsugaru shamisen
 Kiyoshi Ibukuro – koto
 Asa – bass
 Daisuke Kaminaga – shakuhachi
 Wasabi – drums
 Kurona – wadaiko

Charts

References

External links 
 
  (Avex Group)
 
 

Wagakki Band compilation albums
2020 compilation albums
Japanese-language compilation albums
Avex Group compilation albums